The UniPoliSI, formerly known as IPUS and Politecnico degli Studi Internazionali PoliSI (Polytechnic University of International Studies), was an unaccredited distance learning, proprietary, for-profit university previously located in Chiasso (Ticino), Switzerland, and later in Disentis (Switzerland).

The institution had no campus and issued degrees mostly based on "life experiences", though supplementary examinations may be required. The school issued Bachelor's, Master's, and even PhDs in several fields (engineering, economics, law, computer science, physical therapy, nursing school), but most students were Italians working in construction surveying (geometri) who wanted a faster degree in civil engineering without attending Italian institutions. In Italy, the same kind of unaccredited university would be illegal.

Vincenzo Amore, director of UniPoliSi, was arrested in February 2018 for running the fake universities IPUS and UniPoliSi with his wife. He was later sentenced to three years.

References

See also
 List of unaccredited institutions of higher learning
 Educational accreditation

Former for-profit universities and colleges
Unaccredited institutions of higher learning
Distance education institutions based in Switzerland
For-profit universities and colleges in Europe